Nationality words link to articles with information on the nation's poetry or literature (for instance, Irish or France).

Events

 Robert Henryson's cycle The Morall Fabillis probably composed in the 1480s; earliest datable manuscripts of John Barbour's Scottish chivalric epic, Brus, also in this decade.

Works published

1480:

1481:
 Luigi Pulci, Morgante, a 23-canto version (see also 1473, 1482 and the final Morgante Maggiore 1483); Italy

1482:
 Luigi Pulci, Morgante, a 23-canto version (see also 1473, 1481 and the final, 28-canto Morgante Maggiore 1483); Italy

1483:
 Geoffrey Chaucer, English, all posthumously published:
 The House of Fame, edited by William Caxton, an unfinished dream-poem; Caxton wrote the 12-line conclusion
 Troilus and Criseyde, published anonymously, publication year uncertain
 John Gower, Confessio Amantis, written about 1390
 Jami, Yusuf u Zulaikha ("Joseph and Zulaikha"), Persian
 John Lydgate, written at the request of Henry V of England; a very popular poem, with many manuscript copies extant in modern times; Great Britain
 Luigi Pulci, Morgante, sometimes also called Morgante Maggiore (the "Greater Morgante", the name give to the complete 28 canto edition) published in final form this year (see also the shorter versions published in 1473, 1481 and 1482); Italy
1484:
 Shin Maha Rahtathara, Bhuridat Lingagyi, Burma

1485:

1486:

1487:
 Alaoddoule Bakhtishah Samarqandi Daulatshah, Tazkerat Osh-sho-Ara ("The Record of Poets"), Persian literary history (scholarship)
 Blind Harry, The Actes and Deidis of the Illustre and Vallyeant Campioun Schir William Wallace, also known as The Wallace, long "romantic biographical" poem, probably created and published some time in the decade up to this year

1488:
 Sogi, Poem of One Hundred Links Composed by Three Poets at Minase, Japan

1489:
 François Villon, Le Grant Testament Villon et le petit. Son codicille. Le jargon & ses ballades, this was the first publication of various poems of the author, although some are incomplete; includes Poems 1–6 of his "Ballades en jargon"Paris: Pierre Levet (Poems 7–11 were first published in 1892), France

Births

Death years link to the corresponding "[year] in poetry" article:

1480:
 Pir Sultan Abdal (died 1550), Ottoman Empire
 Girolamo Angeriano, also known as "Hieronymus Angerianus" born sometime between about 1470 and about 1490 (died 1535), Italian, Latin-language poet; sources differ on his birth year, with some stating 1470, others giving "c. 1480" and another c. 1490  
 Giovanni Cotta, born about this year (died 1510), Italian, Latin-language poet
 Giovanni Guidiccioni (died 1541), Italian
 Riccardo Sbruglio, born about this year (died 1480 – died after 1525), Italian, Latin-language poet

1481:

1482:
 Andrzej Krzycki (died 1532), Polish archbishop, Latin prose writer and Polish-language poet often considered one of Poland's greatest humanist writers
 Bernardim Ribeiro (died 1552), Portuguese
Matthias Ringmann (died 1511), German cartographer and humanist poet
 Antonio Tilesio (died 1534), Italian, Latin-language poet
 Mavro Vetranović (died 1576), Croatian writer, poet and Benedictine friar

1483:
 November 10 – Martin Luther (died 1546), German Protestant leader and hymn-writer
 Benet Burgh (birth year unknown), English translator
 Fuzûlî (فضولی)  (died c. 1556), Ottoman Empire
 Aurelio Casellio (died 1552), Italian, Latin-language poet
 Andrea Navagero (died 1483–1529), Italian, Latin-language poet

1484:
 Jón Arason (died 1550), Icelandic Roman Catholic bishop and poet
 Purandara Dasa (died 1564), Hindu composer of Carnatic music and Kannada poetry
 Niklaus Manuel (died 1530), Swiss, German-language poet
 Giulio Cesare Scaligero, (died 1558), Italian, Latin-language poet
 Paul Speratus (died 1581), German
 Huldrych Zwingli (died 1531), Swiss theologian, priest, poet, and writer

1485:
 November 30 – Veronica Gambara (died 1550), Italian poet, stateswoman and political leader born in Lombardy
 Hanibal Lucić (died 1553), Croatian poet and playwright
 Nikolaus Decius (died sometime after 1546), German
 Marco Girolamo Vida born about this year (died 1566), Italian, Latin-language poet

1486:
 Pedro Manuel Jiménez de Urrea, (died 1535), Spanish Renaissance poet and playwright

1487:
 Petar Hektorović (died 1572), Croatian writer, poet and collector

1488:
 January 6 – Helius Eobanus Hessus (died 1540), German, Latin poet
 Ulrich von Hutten (died 1523), German
 Michael Weiße (died 1534), German theologian and hymn writer
 Yang Shen (died 1559), Chinese poet

1489:
 Francesco Maria Molza (died 1544), Italian, Latin-language poet
 Thomas Müntzer (died 1525), German
 Rupa Goswami (died 1564), Hindu devotional teacher, poet, and philosopher

Deaths
Birth years link to the corresponding "[year] in poetry" article:

1480:
 December 14 – Niccolò Perotti, also known as "Perotto" or "Nicolaus Perottus" (born 1430, according to some sources, or 1429, according to others, or either year, according to still others) Italian humanist, translator, author of one of the first modern Latin school grammars, and Latin-language poet
 Giovanni Mario Filelfo (born 1426), Italian, Latin-language poet
 Probable date – Ieuan ap Hywel Swrdwal (born 1430), Welsh poet writing in English, the first known to do so
 Approximate date – Raffaele Zovenzoni (born 1431), Italian, Latin-language poet

1481:
 Ikkyū (born 1394), eccentric, iconoclastic Japanese Zen Buddhist priest and poet
 Approximate date – Narsinh Mehta, alternate spelling: Narasingh Mehta (born c. 1414), Indian, Gujarati-language Hindu poet-saint notable as a bhakta, an exponent of Hindu devotional religious poetry; acclaimed as Adi Kavi (Sanskrit for "first among poets") of Gujarat, where he is especially revered

1482:
 (or 1502) – Bonino Mombrizio (born 1424), Italian, Latin-language poet

1483:
 Anthony Woodville (born c. 1422), English poet and translator
 Approximate date – Richard Holland, Scottish cleric and poet

1484:
 August 24 – Ippolita Maria Sforza (born 1446), Italian noblewoman and writer
 November 11 – Luigi Pulci (born 1432), Italian poet and diplomat
 Paolo Marsi (born 1440), Italian, Latin-language poet

1485:
 Lorenzo Lippi da Colle (born 1440), Italian, Latin-language poet (not to be confused with Lorenzo Lippi (1606–1664), Italian painter and poet)
 
1486:
 Ōta Dōkan (born 1432), Japanese samurai warrior-poet, military tactician and Buddhist monk; said to have been a skilled poet, but only fragments of his verse survive

1487:

1488:
 Andronico Callisto, died sometime after 1487, Italian, Latin-language poet

1489:
 Antonio Geraldini (born c. 1449–1489), Italian, Latin-language poet

See also

 Poetry
 15th century in poetry
 15th century in literature
 List of years in poetry
 Grands Rhétoriqueurs
 French Renaissance literature
 Renaissance literature
 Spanish Renaissance literature

Other events:
 Other events of the 15th century
 Other events of the 16th century

16th century:
 16th century in poetry
 16th century in literature

Notes

15th-century poetry
Poetry